In eight-dimensional geometry, a cantic 8-cube or truncated 8-demicube is a uniform 8-polytope, being a truncation of the 8-demicube.

Alternate names 
 Truncated demiocteract
 Truncated hemiocteract (Jonathan Bowers)

Cartesian coordinates 
The Cartesian coordinates for the vertices of a truncated 8-demicube centered at the origin and edge length 6√2 are coordinate permutations:
 (±1,±1,±3,±3,±3,±3,±3,±3)
with an odd number of plus signs.

Images

Notes

References
 H.S.M. Coxeter: 
 H.S.M. Coxeter, Regular Polytopes, 3rd Edition, Dover New York, 1973 
 Kaleidoscopes: Selected Writings of H.S.M. Coxeter, edited by F. Arthur Sherk, Peter McMullen, Anthony C. Thompson, Asia Ivic Weiss, Wiley-Interscience Publication, 1995,  
 (Paper 22) H.S.M. Coxeter, Regular and Semi Regular Polytopes I, [Math. Zeit. 46 (1940) 380-407, MR 2,10]
 (Paper 23) H.S.M. Coxeter, Regular and Semi-Regular Polytopes II, [Math. Zeit. 188 (1985) 559-591]
 (Paper 24) H.S.M. Coxeter, Regular and Semi-Regular Polytopes III, [Math. Zeit. 200 (1988) 3-45]
 Norman Johnson Uniform Polytopes, Manuscript (1991)
 N.W. Johnson: The Theory of Uniform Polytopes and Honeycombs, Ph.D.

External links 
 
 Polytopes of Various Dimensions
 Multi-dimensional Glossary

8-polytopes